The Forever War is a non-fiction book by American journalist Dexter Filkins about his observations on assignment in Afghanistan and Iraq during the 2001 War in Afghanistan and the Iraq War.

As a foreign correspondent for The New York Times, Dexter Filkins has covered the wars in Afghanistan and Iraq since 2001. He has been a finalist for a Pulitzer Prize and a winner of a George Polk Award and two Overseas Press Club Awards.

Awards
The book made the New York Times Book Review list of "10 Best Books of 2008" as chosen by the paper's editors, and was awarded the 2008 National Book Critics Circle Award in General Nonfiction. It was named one of the best nonfiction books of the year by among others The New York Times, Amazon.com, The Washington Post, Time magazine and the Boston Globe.

The book received the 2009 Colby Award.

References

External links
The Forever War at Amazon
Video of Dexter Filkins speaking about The Forever War.

2008 non-fiction books
Iraq War books
War in Afghanistan (2001–2021) books